Raymond Maguire (born 1 December 1944) is an Australian boxer. He competed in the men's light welterweight event at the 1968 Summer Olympics.

References

1944 births
Living people
Australian male boxers
Olympic boxers of Australia
Boxers at the 1968 Summer Olympics
Sportsmen from Queensland
Light-welterweight boxers